KVCO (88.3 FM) is a nonprofit radio station licensed to serve Concordia, Kansas.  The station is owned and operated by Cloud County Community College. It airs an active rock/college radio format, with music of varying genres playing at different times.

The range of KVCO's radio reach is approximately 15 miles.

With the exception of the General Manager position, all positions at the station are voluntary and is run somewhat like a collegiate club or interest organization even though KVCO helps would-be radio workers train for the radio industry.

Sponsorships and underwriting

Any business and organization of reasonable moral foundation may sign up to sponsor on KVCO at rates far lower than that of the commercial radio stations. Underwriting donations can be made in exchange for time on-air. As the station is a noncommercial nonprofit, sponsorship spots can include the sponsoring organization's name, mission, address and business hours.

As the station is noncommercial, by regulation of the U.S. Federal Communications Commission, the sponsorship spots cannot include prices, sales, limited-time offers, comparisons or calls to action.

Staff

Tasha Riggins, Faculty Sponsor
Madison Troshynski, Station Manager
Andrea "Andie" Jackson, Student Manager
Layton Berggren, Student Manager

Directors 
 Chase Stimatze, Sports Director

Volunteers/clubmembers

Cody Siebold
Galen Allen
Max Blaske
Nick Baxa
Hilary Garrett
Chance Finch
Rose Stokes
Taybor Miller
Payton Issacson 
Alisa Turner
Hope Bryant
Raven Tanner
Lyle Kukman

References

External links
 
 
 

Cloud County, Kansas
VCO
Radio stations established in 1977
1977 establishments in Kansas